Pandikkad is a town located in the Eranad Taluk, Malappuram district, Kerala, India.

References

Cities and towns in Malappuram district
Manjeri